Mariptiline (EN-207) is a tricyclic antidepressant (TCA) which was developed in the early 1980s, but was never marketed.

References 

Amines
Dibenzocycloheptenes
Ketoximes
Tricyclic antidepressants
Cyclopropanes
Abandoned drugs